Arthur Joseph Chisholm (born November 11, 1934) is an American former professional ice hockey player who briefly played for the Boston Bruins of the National Hockey League in 1961. He was inducted to the Northeastern University athletics Hall of Fame in 1977.

Amateur career
Following his high school days at Arlington High School, Chisholm was a two time All-American at Northeastern, and was voted to the All New England, All East, and Team MVP award for his three seasons. Chisholm also won the Walter J. Brown Award for the most outstanding American college hockey player in New England. Chisholm still holds the Huskies' record for career goals and single-season goals (40), despite playing far fewer games than anyone else on the team's top career scoring lists; during Chisholm's career, freshmen were not allowed to play on the varsity.

Professional career
Chisholm played briefly for the Bruins during the 1961 season with a 3-game amateur try-out contract.  It would prove to be his only professional hockey action, and other than a single season of local senior hockey in 1966, he never again played organized hockey.

Career statistics

Regular season and playoffs

Awards and honors

References

External links
 
GoNU.com Hall of Fame Profile 

1934 births
Living people
Boston Bruins players
American men's ice hockey centers
AHCA Division I men's ice hockey All-Americans
Ice hockey players from Massachusetts
Northeastern Huskies men's ice hockey players
People from Arlington, Massachusetts
Sportspeople from Middlesex County, Massachusetts